Weisstein (German for "white stone") can refer to:

People
Eric W. Weisstein (born 1969), American encyclopedist
Naomi Weisstein (1939–2015), American cognitive psychologist, neuroscientist, author, and professor

Places
Paide, Estonia
Bilyi Kamin, Lviv Oblast, Ukraine
Weisstein, Waldenburg

German-language surnames